Fones Cliff, is an historic site along the Rappahannock river. It is a sandstone bluff in Richmond County, Virginia.

The  Rappahannock people  lived in three villages nearby, Wecuppom, Matchopick and Pissacoack.

In 1608, John Smith mapped the area and village of Pissacoack.

The site is a bank of the Rappahannock river part of The Captain John Smith Chesapeake National Historic Trail.

In 2022, the Rappahannock Tribe, in partnership with Department of the Interior, Chesapeake Conservancy, The Wilderness Society, Acres for America,  acquired 465-acres of land and placed a conservation easement. Chief Anne Richardson and  Deb Haaland participated at the transfer ceremony.

References

External links 

 https://rwrfriends.org/visit/fones-cliffs/
 https://riverfriends.org/fones-cliff/
Rappahannock River